Jemeel Moondoc (August 5, 1946 – August 29, 2021) was a jazz saxophonist who played alto saxophone. He was a proponent of a highly improvisational style.

He was born in Chicago, Illinois, United States, and studied clarinet and piano before settling on saxophone at sixteen. He became interested in jazz largely due to Cecil Taylor and at the University of Wisconsin–Madison, he was a student of Taylor's. After that he moved to New York City, where he founded "Ensemble Muntu" with William Parker, Roy Campbell, Jr., and Rashid Bakr. The group also had its own Muntu record label, but eventually faced financial difficulties. In 1984, he formed the Jus Grew Orchestra, which secured a residency at the Neither/Nor club in the Lower East Side. He worked with Parker again in 1998's album, New World Pygmies.

He died in August 2021, at the age of 75 from the effects of sickle cell anemia.

Discography

As leader
 First Feeding (Muntu, 1977)
 The Evening of the Blue Men (Muntu, 1979)
 New York Live! (Cadence Jazz, 1981)
 The Intrepid Live in Poland (Poljazz, 1981)
 We Don't (Eremite, 1981; issued 2003) - with Denis Charles
 Judy's Bounce (Soul Note, 1982)
 The Athens Concert (Praxis, 1982)
 Konstanze's Delight (Soul Note, 1983)
 Nostalgia in Times Square (Soul Note, 1986)
 Tri-P-Let (Eremite, 1996)
 Fire in the Valley (Eremite, 1997)
 New World Pygmies (Eremite, 1998)
 Revolt of the Negro Lawn Jockeys (Eremite, 2001)
 New World Pygmies vol. 2 (Eremite, 2002)
 Live at Glenn Miller Café Vol 1 (Ayler, 2002)
 Live in Paris (Cadence, 2003)
 Two (Relative Pitch, 2012) - with Connie Crothers
 The Zookeeper's House (Relative Pitch, 2014)
 Cosmic Nickelodeon (Relative Pitch, 2016) - with Hilliard Greene

with the Jus Grew Orchestra
 Spirit House (Eremite, 2001)
 Live at the Vision Festival (Ayler, 2003)

As sideman

with Denis Charles
 Captain of the Deep (Eremite, 1998)

with Steve Swell
 This Now! (Cadence Jazz, 2003)
 Swimming in a Galaxy of Goodwill and Sorrow (RogueArt, 2007)

References

External links
[ All Music]

1951 births
Living people
Avant-garde jazz musicians
University of Wisconsin–Madison alumni
Jazz alto saxophonists
Musicians from Chicago
CIMP artists
RogueArt artists
21st-century saxophonists
NoBusiness Records artists
Cadence Jazz Records artists
Black Saint/Soul Note artists